Eyes of The Heart is an album by American pianist Keith Jarrett featuring his "American Quartet", made up of Jarrett himself, Dewey Redman, Charlie Haden and Paul Motian.  It was recorded at the Theater am Kornmarkt, Bregenz in Austria in May 1976 and was released in 1979 by ECM Records.  The studio album The Survivors' Suite had been recorded one month earlier.

Although recorded the same year before Byablue (released in 1977) and Bop-Be (released in 1978), Eyes of The Heart was the last album released to feature Jarrett's American quartet.

Original notes 
As part of the public farewell and disbanding of Jarrett's "American Quartet" the CD and vinyl issues contained a few notes addressed to its members:

Reception
Writing for AllMusic, Scott Yanow called the album "intriguing", and wrote: "Every recording by this particular group (arguably Jarrett's best working ensemble) is well worth hearing, for they had their own sound and the ability to play both 'inside' and 'outside' simultaneously, and they were continually full of surprises." In an article for Between Sound and Space, Tyran Grillo commented: "Just when I think I've encountered the extent of Jarrett's immeasurable talents, he surprises me with an album like this. It's always a pleasure to hear his peripheral instrumental work, for his talents at the keyboard transfer effortlessly to reed by way of our grateful hearts. Perhaps the title is more than just a metaphor."

Track listing 
All music composed by Keith Jarrett.
 "Eyes of the Heart (Part One)" – 17:11
 "Eyes of the Heart (Part Two)" – 15:43
 "Encore (a-b-c)" – 18:03

Personnel
 Keith Jarrett – piano, soprano saxophone, osi drums, tambourine 
 Dewey Redman – tenor saxophone, tambourine, maracas
 Charlie Haden – bass
 Paul Motian – drums, percussion

Production
 Manfred Eicher – producer
 Martin Wieland – recording engineer
 Barbara Wojirsch – design
 Keith Jarrett - photography

References

External links 
 

Keith Jarrett live albums
1976 live albums
Live post-bop albums
ECM Records live albums
Albums produced by Manfred Eicher